Jo Cheryl Exum (born May 1946) is a feminist biblical scholar. She is currently Emeritus Professor at the University of Sheffield.

Education and career 
Exum studied at Wake Forest University, where she received her BA, and Columbia University, where she received her MA and PhD. Previously, she taught at Boston College. She served as part of the translation team for the New Revised Standard Version. While at Sheffield, Exum served as Director of the university's Centre for the Study of the Bible in the Modern World. In 2004, Exum co-founded Sheffield Phoenix Press, an academic publisher of books in biblical studies, along with David J. A. Clines and Keith W. Whitelam.

Exum held a number of notable leadership positions in academia, including president of the Society for Old Testament Study. She has been the editor of a number of journals in her field. She was the Executive Editor of Biblical Interpretation for more than a decade and co-edited the journal Biblical Reception.

In 2011, a Festschrift was published in her honour. A Critical Engagement: Essays on the Hebrew Bible in Honour of J. Cheryl Exum included contributions by David Clines, Ellen van Wolde, and Michael Fox. On January 30, 2015, Exum received an honorary doctorate from the Faculty of Theology at Uppsala University.

Selected works

Books

References

Living people
Old Testament scholars
Academics of the University of Sheffield
Wake Forest University alumni
Columbia University alumni
Boston College faculty
Translators of the Bible into English
1946 births
Feminist studies scholars
Female biblical scholars
Feminist biblical scholars
Academic journal editors
British women non-fiction writers
Female Bible Translators
Presidents of the Society for Old Testament Study